Extreme GAS Disambiguation page.

 An old television Show on Nickelodeon Games and Sports for Kids
 A nickname for Xtreme Drilling and Coil Services Corp.